Russett is an unincorporated community in Johnston County, Oklahoma, United States. A post office operated in Russett from 1894 to 1924.

References

Unincorporated communities in Johnston County, Oklahoma
Unincorporated communities in Oklahoma